The Nokia C2 is a Nokia-branded entry-level smartphone by HMD Global, running Android Go. It was announced on March 16, 2020.

Specifications 
The Nokia C2 is powered by a Unisoc System-on-Chip and 1 GB of RAM. It has 16 GB of internal storage, which can be expanded with a MicroSD card. The phone has a 5.7-inch HD+ display.

The phone weighs 161 g and is 8.85 mm thick. It has thick bezels with a chin at the bottom. The phone is sold in 2 colours — Cyan and Black.

C2 2nd Edition
C2 2nd Edition comes with Android Go 11.

References 

C2
Mobile phones introduced in 2020
Mobile phones with user-replaceable battery
Discontinued smartphones